The Miss Aruba 2018 the 51st edition of the Miss Aruba pageant was held in Alhambra Ballroom, Divi Resorts in Oranjestad, Aruba. Alina Mansur crowned her successor at the end of the event. 4 contestants from the islands in Aruba competed. The winner represented Aruba in Miss Universe 2018 and Miss World 2018 pageant.

Placements

Contestants
The official Top 4 finalists of The Next Miss Aruba 2018.

References

External links 
 
 Facebook page

Beauty pageants in Aruba
Dutch awards
2018 beauty pageants